Laccocephalum basilapidoides, referred to as the stone-making fungus, is a fungus known only from Australia.

Taxonomy
The species was originally described in 1895 by Daniel McAlpine & Tepper. American mycologist Curtis Gates Lloyd transferred it to the genus Polyporus in 1912, but the original name has nomenclatural precedence.

Characteristics
Laccocephalum basilapidoides is a solitary fungus with annual hymenophore. The woody and pitted pileus (13/4-15/4 inches in diameter) is irregularly concave in the middle while convex in the remainder. The pileus is brownish fawn with coffee-colored margin, the inner substance of which, however, is thick, whitish, and unchangeable.  Pits are relatively small and conical in the middle whereas larger and elliptical in the surrounding rows. The hymenophore is greyish-fawn to reddish-brown, solid, and continuous with stem, which consists of adnate tubes and large, crowded, and oval pores. The spores are spherical (44-50 μm in diameter), orange-yellow, and echinulate with spines 3 μm long.  The fawn stem is compressed oval, 1/2*3/4 inches in diameter and 1 inch in length, which rises abruptly from a whitish mycelium 3 inches in height and 13/4*4 inches in diameter. The mycelium agglutinated grains of the sandy soil to form a stone-like basal portion resembles a concretion of ferruginous sandstone in appearance and almost in density (the whole fungus in the figure weighed as heavy as 13.25 ounces).

Nomenclature
The nomenclature of L. basilapiloides is rather weird. It originated from the fungus's stone-like basal portion (basilapidoides = Latin basis base+ lapis stone + Greek οειδής likeness). However, when McAlpine and Tepper first described this species, the name they adopted was actually basilapiloides. Both basilapiloides and basilapidoides were used when Lloyd moved it to genus Polyporus. The term basilapidoides seems to be more accurate in grammar. The commonly accepted scientific name currently is "Laccocephalum basilapidoides" which differs from either McAlpine and Tepper's description or Lloyd's system.

Synonyms:
 Laccocephalum basilapiloides McAlpine & Tepper, 1895
 Polyporus basilapidoides (McAlpine & Tepper) Lloyd, 1912
 Polyporus basilapiloides (McAlpine & Tepper) Lloyd, 1912

References

Polyporaceae
Fungi described in 1895
Fungi of Australia
Taxa named by Daniel McAlpine